TUGSAT-1, also known as BRITE-Austria and CanX-3B, is the first Austrian satellite. It is an optical astronomy spacecraft operated by the Graz University of Technology as part of the international BRIght-star Target Explorer programme.

Details
The satellite will be used, along with five other spacecraft, to conduct photometric observations of stars with apparent magnitude of greater than 4.0 as seen from Earth. TUGSAT-1 was one of the first two BRITE satellites to be launched, along with the Austro-Canadian UniBRITE-1 spacecraft. Four more satellites, two Canadian and two Polish, were launched at later dates.

Launch
The TUGSAT-1 spacecraft was launched through the University of Toronto's Nanosatellite Launch System programme, as part of the NLS-8 launch, along with UniBRITE-1 and AAUSAT3. The NLS-8 launch was subcontracted to the Indian Space Research Organisation (ISRO), who placed the satellites into orbit using a Polar Satellite Launch Vehicle (PSLV) in the PSLV-CA configuration, flying from the First Launch Pad at the Satish Dhawan Space Centre. The NLS spacecraft were secondary payloads on the rocket, whose primary mission was to deploy the Franco-Indian SARAL ocean research satellite. Canada's Sapphire and NEOSSat-1 spacecraft, and the United Kingdom's STRaND-1, were also carried by the same rocket under separate launch contracts. The launch took place at 12:31 UTC on 25 February 2013, and the rocket deployed all of its payloads successfully.

See also

UniBRITE-1
BRITE-Toronto
BRITE-Montreal
Lem (BRITE-PL)
Heweliusz (BRITE-PL)

References

Spacecraft launched in 2013
Satellites of Austria
Space telescopes
First artificial satellites of a country
2013 in Austria
Space program of Austria
Graz University of Technology
Spacecraft launched by PSLV rockets